Joel Harrison is an American jazz guitarist, singer, composer, and arranger.

Career
Harrison was born in Washington, D.C. and graduated from Bard College, New York, in 1980 with a Bachelor of Arts in composition and performance. His father was Gilbert Harrison, the editor and owner of the magazine The New Republic, and his mother was Anne Harrison (née Blaine), granddaughter of International Harvester heiress Anita McCormick Blaine, making him a member of the McCormick family. The couple had four children: James, David, Joel and Eleanor.

Harrison has identified the Beatles, Jimi Hendrix, the Allman Brothers Band and Washington guitarist Danny Gatton as early influences. Having begun his career as a musician in Boston during the early 1980s, Harrison moved to the Bay Area of San Francisco, where he led several musical ensembles and became a session musician. Since 1999, he has been based in New York City. His mentors and teachers have included Joan Tower, Ali Akbar Khan, W. A. Mathieu, and Charlie Banacos.

In 2010, Harrison was appointed a Guggenheim Fellow. That same year, he founded the Alternative Guitar Summit (AGS), an annual festival in New York that aims to present and explore the guitar's potential in all musical genres. The AGS advisory board is headed by Pat Metheny, while the 2017 Summit included initiatives hosted by guitarists Marc Ribot, Larry Campbell, Chris Eldridge, Steve Cardenas, Cindy Cashdollar and Miles Okazaki.

Several of Harrison's albums have received critical acclaim, including Free Country (2003), Harrison on Harrison (2005) and Urban Myths (2009). His work has included film scores, big-band projects, and a collaboration with Indian sarod player Anupam Shobhakar titled Leave the Door Open (2013). The AllMusic website describes Harrison's style as an "electrifying blend of creative jazz, modern classical, and ethnic fusion", while Down Beat magazine has rated him "a guitarist, composer and arranger of amazing skill and breadth". His collaborators have included Dave Liebman, Mark Feldman, Marty Ehrlich, David Binney, Dewey Redman, Norah Jones, Uri Caine and Christian Howes.

Discography

As leader
 3 + 3 = 7 (Nine Winds, 1996)
 Range of Motion (Koch, 1997)
 Transience Spirit (Nectar, 2001)
 Free Country (ACT, 2003)
 So Long 2nd Street (ACT, 2004)
 Harrison On Harrison (HighNote, 2005)
 Harbor (HighNote, 2007)
 Passing Train (Intuition, 2008)
 The Wheel (Intuition, 2008)
 Urban Myths (HighNote, 2009)
 The Music of Paul Motian (Sunnyside, 2010)
 Search (Sunnyside, 2011)
 Holy Abyss with Lorenzo Feliciati (Cuneiform, 2012)
 Infinite Possibility (Sunnyside, 2013)
 Mother Stump (Cuneiform, 2014)
 Multiplicity: Leave the Door Open with Anupam Shobhakar (Whirlwind, 2014)
 Spirit House (Whirlwind, 2015)
 The Other River (Whirlwind, 2017)
 Angel Band Vol. 3: Free Country (HighNote, 2018)
 Still Point: Turning World (Whirlwind, 2019)
 America at War (Sunnyside, 2020)

As sideman
 Laura Andel, In::tension:. (Rossbin, 2005)
 Adam Rudolph, Turning Towards the Light (Cuneiform, 2015)

References

Living people
Guitarists from New York City
American jazz guitarists
American jazz composers
American male jazz composers
American jazz singers
HighNote Records artists
1957 births
Jazz musicians from New York (state)
American male guitarists
Sunnyside Records artists
Cuneiform Records artists
ACT Music artists
McCormick family
Whirlwind Recordings artists